Oliver Montana Silverholt (born 22 June 1994) is a Swedish footballer who plays for Östers IF in Superettan. He preferably plays as a central midfielder or a left defender.

Career
He began playing football at the local club BK Astrio at a young age. In 2010, at age 16, he joined Halmstads BK where he continued to play youth football for another couple of years. He made his senior competitive debut for Halmstad in 2012 in an away fixture against Umeå FC in Superettan. The club won promotion to Allsvenskan the same season, where Silverholt went on to play another two full years as a frequent starter. In total he featured in 47 games for Halmstad.

Before the 2015 season, he signed a three year-contract with newly promoted Hammarby IF from Stockholm as a Bosman. There, he linked up with his former youth coach Mats Jingblad, now the general manager at Hammarby.

He went on to make 15 appearances for Hammarby in 2015. In 2016, Silverholt however struggled with fitness due to injuries and thus only featured in one competitive game for the side.

On 1 March 2017, he went on a season long loan to Varbergs BoIS in Superettan.

Personal
He is the younger brother of Simon Silverholt, who also is a professional football player representing Halmstad BK.

Silverholt is a supporter of FC Barcelona, citing Argentinian Lionel Messi as his favourite player.

References

External links

1994 births
Living people
Association football defenders
Hammarby Fotboll players
Halmstads BK players
Varbergs BoIS players
Östers IF players
Superettan players
Allsvenskan players
Swedish footballers
Sweden under-21 international footballers
Sweden youth international footballers